Lajwanti is an Indian television drama show, which premiered on 28 September 2015 on Zee TV. The story is loosely based on Rajinder Singh Bedi's 1956 book titled Lajwanti, Land of five rivers and is set during Partition of India. The show was produced by Trilogy Media.
The show is about the relationship between Sunderlal Bharadwaj and Lajwanti (Lajo) living in Badami Bagh Lahore. They face many perils throughout the course of their relationship. The series ended on 5 February 2016, where Sunder, who had previously lost his memory and wandered away, reunites with Lajo, and is stopped from marrying Gunwanti. Lajo and Sunder proceed to get married again, jubilantly ending the show.

Cast 
 Ankitta Sharma as Lajwanti
 Sid Makkar as Sunderlal Bharadwaj
 Rohit Khurana as Jamal
Sonam Bisht as Dulari Bharadwaj
 Nisha Nagpal as Gunwanti
Deepali Pansare as Nooran 
Suraj Kakkar as Chaman Kishan Lal Bharadwaj
 Shiny Dixit as Indumati 
 Andy von Eich as Officer Eric Burns
 Viraj Kapoor as Iqbal  
 Alexander (Sasha) Dolbenko as Officer Preston
Vidur Anand as Lalchand
Pankaj Pareek as Safaraz
 Niilam Paanchal as Shakunta Kishan Lal Bharadwaj
 Vishal Ganatra as Amrish Bharadwaj
 Harsh Singh as Kishan Lal Bharadwaj
 Aakash Pandey as Anwar
 Razia Sukhbir as Virmati Kishori Lal Bharadwaj

References

External links
Lajwanti Official website
 Download All Episode Of Lajwanti

Zee TV original programming
Indian drama television series
2015 Indian television series debuts
2016 Indian television series endings
Indian historical television series
Indian period television series
Television shows based on Indian novels
Television shows set in Punjab, India
Television shows set in Pakistan
Partition of India in fiction
India–Pakistan relations in popular culture
Television series set in the 1940s